Maireana triptera, the three-wing bluebush, is a species of flowering plant in the family Amaranthaceae, native to Australia (except Tasmania). It is a compact shrub reaching , with bluish-green leaves.

References

triptera
Endemic flora of Australia
Plants described in 1975